The Chomba sea catfish (Notarius osculus) is a species of catfish in the family Ariidae. It was described by David Starr Jordan and Charles Henry Gilbert in 1883, originally under the genus Arius. It inhabits coastal marine and brackish waters in Costa Rica and Panama.

References

Ariidae
Fish described in 1883